Sri Marathandavar Bala Dhandayuthapani Alayam is a temple in Maran District, Pahang, Malaysia. Panguni Uthiram, which occurs during the month of March/April is celebrated in this temple.  Numerous devotees come to perform there as well as carry Kavadi.

References

Hindu temples in Malaysia
Maran District
Religious buildings and structures in Pahang
Tourist attractions in Pahang